National Secondary Route 139, or just Route 139 (or ) is a National Road Route of Costa Rica, located in the Alajuela province.

Description
In Alajuela province the route covers Los Chiles canton (Caño Negro district), Guatuso canton (Buenavista district).

References

Highways in Costa Rica